The Glory Day is Misia's first mini-album, released on November 21, 1998. It sold 114,820 copies in its first week and peaked at #6. The Glory Day was recorded in London with the collaboration of a local gospel group.

Track listing

Charts

Oricon sales chart

External links
Sony Music Online Japan : MISIA

Misia EPs
1998 debut EPs
Japanese-language EPs
Albums produced by Shirō Sagisu